Bulgaria–Mexico relations are the diplomatic relations between Bulgaria and Mexico. Both nations are mutual members of the United Nations and the World Trade Organization.

History
In 1936, both Bulgaria and Mexico signed a Treaty of Friendship. Diplomatic relations between both nations were established on 6 January 1938. In 1941, during World War II, both nations suspended diplomatic relations when Bulgaria joined the Tripartite Pact (a military alliance between the Axis powers and Bulgaria, among others). In May 1942, Mexico declared war on the Axis powers. Diplomatic relations between both nations were resumed on 11 July 1974. In 1976, both nations opened resident embassies in each other's capitals.

In June 1978, Mexican President José López Portillo paid an official visit to Bulgaria. In 1979, Bulgarian President Todor Zhivkov reciprocated the visit to Mexico. In 1989 Mexico closed its embassy in Sofia due to financial restraints. Since then, relations between both nations have been conducted mainly at United Nations summits. In November 2008, Bulgarian President Georgi Parvanov paid an official visit to Mexico and met with Mexican President Felipe Calderón. In 2018, both nations celebrated 80 years since establishing diplomatic relations.

High-level visits

High-level visits from Bulgaria to Mexico
 President Todor Zhivkov (1979)
 President Georgi Parvanov (2008)

High-level visits from Mexico to Bulgaria
 President José López Portillo (1978)

Bilateral agreements
Both nations have signed a few bilateral agreements such as an Agreement on Touristic Cooperation (1980); Agreement of a Convention on Consular Relations (1986); Agreement on Scientific and Technical Cooperation (1994) and an Agreement on Cultural and Educational Cooperation (1995). Both nations have also agreed to establish periodical Bilateral Political Consultation Meetings for which they have met in 2002, 2006, 2007 and 2012.

Migration
Although Mexico was not a major destination for Bulgarian migrants; several hundred migrants from Bulgaria immigrated to Mexico in order to travel to the United States in the mid-1960s after the United States passed the Immigration and Nationality Act of 1965 which abolished the quota system based on national origins. More recently, many Bulgarians, primarily women, have been trafficked from their homes mainly with the promise of going to the United States. However, after they arrived in Mexico, they were made to become prostitutes and/or sex slaves.

Trade
In 1997, Mexico signed a Free Trade Agreement with the European Union (which includes Bulgaria). In 2018, trade between Bulgaria and Mexico totaled US$131 million. Bulgaria's main exports to Mexico include: mineral and chemical deposits, fruit seeds, unexposed film and textiles. Mexico's main exports to Bulgaria include: computers, mobile phones and other electronics. Mexican multinational company América Móvil operates in Bulgaria.

Resident diplomatic missions 
 Bulgaria has an embassy in Mexico City.
 Mexico is accredited to Bulgaria from its embassy in Budapest, Hungary and maintains an honorary consulate in Sofia.

See also 
 Foreign relations of Bulgaria
 Foreign relations of Mexico
 Bulgarian Mexicans

References

Mexico 
Bilateral relations of Mexico